Or So It Seems is an album by Graham Lewis, Bruce Gilbert and Daniel Miller under the pseudonym Duet Emmo (an anagram of Dome and Mute), released in 1983 by Mute Records.

The title track was also released as a 12" single and its b-side "Heart of Hearts" was included as a bonus track on CD releases of the album.

Reception 

AllMusic called it "less a seamless marriage of the collaborators' aesthetics than an awkward cohabitation of abstruse Dome material with more accessible and melodic synth-oriented fare". Trouser Press wrote: "Or So It Seems fluctuates between atonal, electronic sound collages and stiff, monotonous synth-funk reminiscent of D.A.F., with no track ever getting off the ground. Fun studio noodling no doubt, but not of lasting import."

Track listing

References

External links 
 

1983 debut albums
Wire (band)
Albums produced by John Fryer (producer)